In mathematics, and particularly category theory, a coherence condition is a collection of conditions requiring that various compositions of elementary morphisms are equal. Typically the elementary morphisms are part of the data of the category. A coherence theorem states that, in order to be assured that all these equalities hold, it suffices to check a small number of identities.

An illustrative example: a monoidal category

Part of the data of a monoidal category is a chosen morphism
, called the associator:

 

for each triple of objects  in the category. Using compositions of these , one can construct a morphism

 

Actually, there are many ways to construct such a morphism as a composition of various . One coherence condition that is typically imposed is that these compositions are all equal.

Typically one proves a coherence condition using a coherence theorem, which states that one only needs to check a few equalities of compositions in order to show that the rest also hold. In the above example, one only needs to check that, for all quadruples of objects , the following diagram commutes.

Further examples

Two simple examples that illustrate the definition are as follows. Both are directly from the definition of a category.

Identity
By composing these with f, we construct two morphisms:
, and
.
Both are morphisms between the same objects as f. We have, accordingly, the following coherence statement:
.

Associativity of composition
Let ,  and  be morphisms of a category containing objects A, B, C and D. By repeated composition, we can construct a morphism from A to D in two ways:
, and
.
We have now the following coherence statement:
.

In these two particular examples, the coherence statements are theorems for the case of an abstract category, since they follow directly from the axioms; in fact, they are axioms. For the case of a concrete mathematical structure, they can be viewed as conditions, namely as requirements for the mathematical structure under consideration to be a concrete category, requirements that such a structure may meet or fail to meet.

References
 

Category theory